Pasay's at-large congressional district is the sole congressional district of the Philippines in the city of Pasay. It has been represented in the House of Representatives of the Philippines since 1987 and earlier in the Batasang Pambansa from 1984 to 1986. Pasay first elected a single representative city-wide at-large for the Regular Batasang Pambansa following the 1984 Philippine constitutional plebiscite that amended the 1973 constitution and abolished the regional at-large assembly districts. Before 1973, the city was represented in the national legislatures as part of Rizal's 1st and at-large districts and Manila's at-large district. The district was re-created on February 2, 1987 following the ratification of the 1987 constitution that restored the House of Representatives. It is currently represented in the 19th Congress by Antonino G. Calixto of the PDP–Laban.

Representation history

Election results

2022

2019

2016

2013

2010

2007

2004

2001

1998

1995

1992

1987

See also 
Legislative district of Pasay

References

Congressional districts of the Philippines
Politics of Pasay
1984 establishments in the Philippines
At-large congressional districts of the Philippines
Congressional districts of Metro Manila
Constituencies established in 1984